Giorgia Carrossa (born July 31, 1986) is an Italian former competitive figure skater. She is the 2004 Triglav Trophy silver medalist and 2003 Italian national bronze medalist. She reached the free skate at two ISU Championships – the 2003 World Junior Championships in Ostrava and the 2004 World Junior Championships in The Hague.

After retiring from competition, Carrossa performed in ice shows (Holiday on Ice) before turning to coaching, in 2010. She works at the Young Goose Academy in Egna, Italy. She is a technical specialist in singles and pairs.

Programs

Competitive highlights 
JGP: Junior Grand Prix

References

External links
 

1986 births
Italian female single skaters
Living people
Sportspeople from Bolzano